Pnigalio mediterraneus is a species of insect in the family Eulophidae. It is a parasitoid of the olive fruit fly and the horse-chestnut leaf miner.

Some works have considered this species to be a synonym of P. agraules, however molecular and morphological characterization has been used to demonstrate that they are distinct but closely related.

References

Eulophidae